Rukometni klub Željezničar is a handball club from Sarajevo, Bosnia and Herzegovina.

Accomplishments
 Yugoslav Handball Championship
Winners: 1978
 IHF Cup
Runners-up: 1982

References

Bosnia and Herzegovina handball clubs
Sport in Sarajevo